Krzysztof Filip Kwinta (born 28 February 1980) is a Polish former professional tennis player.

A two-time Polish national champion in doubles, Kwinta is a native of Poznań and was a member of the Poland Davis Cup team in 2000. He featured in the doubles rubber of a tie against Slovenia in Szczecin, where he and partner Marcin Matkowski defeated Andrej Kračman and Marko Tkalec. On the ATP Tour, he made two main draw appearances in doubles at the local Idea Prokom Open.

Kwinta, who is also known by the given name "Kris", played two seasons of collegiate tennis for the UCLA Bruins and was a doubles All-American in 2004. He won the deciding match for the Bruins of the 2005 NCAA Division I Championship final, over Baylor's Lars Pörschke.

ITF Futures titles

Doubles: (3)

See also
List of Poland Davis Cup team representatives

References

External links
 
 
 

1980 births
Living people
Polish male tennis players
UCLA Bruins men's tennis players
Sportspeople from Poznań